This is a list of the royal titles of Yoruba monarchs. It is not in the order of seniority.

Alake of Egbaland
Olubadan
Olowo of Owo
Owa of Otan Ayegbaju
Osemawe of Ondo Kingdom
Orangun
Oba of Lagos
Alaafin of Oyo
Ooni of Ife
Olofin Adimula of Ado-Odo
Owa Obokun Adimula of Ijeshaland
Owatapa of Itapa Ekiti
Olumushin of Mushinland 
Orimolusi of Ijebu Igbo
Awujale of Ijebu Ode
Akarigbo of Sagamu
 Oluwo of Iwo
Soun of Ogbomoso
Ayangburen of Ikorodu
Oloko of Ijebu-Imushin
Moyegeso of Itele
Alaketu of Ketu
Ogunsua of Modakeke
Alakan of Aiyepe
Dagburewe of Idowa
Elese of Ilese
Deji of Akure Kingdom
Ataoja of Oshogbo
Sopen Lukale of Oke Sopen, Ijebu Igbo
Beje Roku of Oke Agbo, Ijebu Igbo
Kegbo of Atikori, Ijebu Igbo
Olokine of Ojowo, Ijebu Igbo
Abijaparako of Japara, Ijebu Igbo
Okere of Saki
Timi of Ede
Elemure of Emure-Ekiti
Owa Ajero of Ijero Ekiti
Ewi of Ado Ekiti
Oluyin of Iyin Ekiti
Alara of Aramoko
Ogoga of Ikere Ekiti
Alaaye of Efon Ekiti
Olojido of Ido Ekiti
Alayetoro of Ayetoro Ekiti
Oluloro of Iloro Ekiti
Amapetu of Mahin
 Obaleo of Erinmope Ekiti
 Oba Elekole of Ikole Ekiti
 Attah of Aiyede Ekiti
 Onisan of Isan Ekiti

References

Yoruba history
Yoruba royal titles